Pontrhydyfen (or Pont-rhyd-y-fen) is a small village in the Afan Valley, in Neath Port Talbot county borough in Wales. The village sits at the confluence of the River Afan and the smaller Afon Pelenna, 1.8 miles (2.9 km) north of the larger village of Cwmafan and not far from the towns of Port Talbot and Neath. The views from the village are dominated by the hills of Foel Fynyddau (370 m) to the west, Moel y Fen (260 m) to the south-east and Mynydd Pen-rhys (280 m) to the north. This former coal mining community is distinguished by two large 19th-century bridges that span the valley: a railway viaduct (the red bridge) and a former aqueduct, known in the Welsh language as Y Bont Fawr ("The Big Bridge"). The built-up area has a population of around 830. It is in the community of Pelenna.

Things to do / amenities 
 Afan Forest Park
 Mountain biking. Home to the nearby Afan Forest Park, the valley offers the best places for mountain biking in South Wales and is consistently ranked highly within the best in the UK.
 Walking
 Penrhys Trail
 Pontrhydyfen Community Centre
 Pontrhydyfen RFC

History 
The industrial history of Oakwood began in the 1820s, when the first blast furnace was lighted for the Pontrhydyfen Iron Works and coalmaster John Reynolds built the aqueduct to power it. By 1877 local Ordnance Survey maps show the site of the iron works as ruins, but there are continued historical references to the two blast furnaces at Pontrhydyfen until 1902.

 The Red Bridge / Viaduct. The nine-arch Pontrhydyfen viaduct built in 1898 was the last railway bridge built in the valley.
 The Bont Fawr Aqueduct (aka The Big Bridge). Built by John Reynolds and completed in 1827, the four-arch aqueduct is 153 yards (140 m) long and over 75 feet (23 m) high. A watercourse some two miles long carried water from the Afan; it supplied the water which powered the giant waterwheels of the Oakwood / Pontrhydyfen Ironworks. Its use in supplying the waterwheels was relatively short-lived, and there is no record it being used for this purpose following the acquisition of the site by Governor and Company of Copper Miners in 1841. The Bont Fawr Aqueduct is 'one of the few surviving structures relating to the use of water power in the iron industry in the region' and is a Grade II* listed building. It remains in use today as a bridge for pedestrians and cyclists, the canal which it once carried having been filled in.
 Mining. George Yates' Map of the County Glamorgan shows Coal Pits just south of Oakwood on the West slopes of Moel y Fen and Mynydd Bychan by 1799. By 1875 maps show a range of collieries including: Craig (SS 788933), Graiglyn (SS 788935) & Wernavon (SS 791936) on the south-east slopes of Foel Fynddau, each serviced by tramways, and Craig-y-fedw (SS 787947) on the east slope of Mynydd Hawdref and then by 1914 maps show Oakwood Colliery (SS 799941) just to the south-east of Rhyslyn Carpark.
 Quarries. By 1897 maps show evidence of 3 quarries on Moel y Fen, 1 on Mynydd Hawdref (just west of Efail-fach), 2 on east slopes of Foel Fynyddau, 2 on the south slopes of Mynydd Pen-Rhys and 1 in the vicinity of Penhydd-fach.

Famous people 
Pontrhydyfen was the birthplace of actor Richard Burton, Broadway theatre and musical star Ivor Emmanuel who was also in Zulu, international opera singer Rebecca Evans, singer and songwriter Geraint Griffiths, and actor Mark Frankel. The Richard Burton Appreciation Society is based in the village.

Points of interest 
The hills surrounding the village are home to a number of mobile phone masts that are prominent markers on the horizon:

References

External links 
 www.geograph.co.uk : photos of Pontrhydyfen and surrounding area

Villages in Neath Port Talbot
Afan Valley